Psychedelic Pill is the 32nd studio album by Canadian / American musician Neil Young, released on October 30, 2012. It is the second collaboration between Young and Crazy Horse released in 2012 (the first being Americana) and their first original work together since the Greendale album and tour in 2003 and 2004. The album was streamed on Young's website on October 24, 2012, and leaked onto the Internet the same day.

A High Fidelity Pure Audio Blu-ray Disc version of the album, with 24-bit/192kHz resolution and two bonus tracks, was released November 19, 2012. A vinyl version is also available.

Recording
At 87 minutes in length, Psychedelic Pill is Neil Young's longest studio album and, until World Record in 2022, the only one to span two compact discs. Many of the songs on the album came out of extended jam sessions with Crazy Horse while recording Americana, released earlier in 2012. Three of Psychedelic Pill'''s nine tracks are more than 15 minutes in length. The album was recorded at Young's ranch near Redwood City, California.

The opening track "Driftin' Back" makes references to Young's new memoir Waging Heavy Peace and his disdain for MP3s in between segments of extended jamming. Another of the album's extended tracks, "Walk like a Giant", laments the failure of his generation to change the world for the better ("We were ready to save the world / But then the weather changed"). Elsewhere on the album Young recalls listening to Bob Dylan's "Like a Rolling Stone" and The Grateful Dead on the radio ("Twisted Road"), and his Canadian roots ("Born in Ontario"). A review of the album for Rolling Stone noted that the riff and lyrics of the title track share similarities with Young's previous work such as "Cinnamon Girl". The main riff is borrowed from Young's "Sign of Love". That track also features the recording filtered with a phaser effect, giving it a "psychedelic" feel (although the alternate mix removes the effect).

The 3-LP vinyl version contains the same tracks as the 2-CD set, though in a slightly different order, and with "Driftin' Back" split into two parts over sides A and B. The Blu-ray version contains two bonus tracks: the 37-minute "Horse Back", and a second alternate mix of the song "Psychedelic Pill".

Reception

Overall, Psychedelic Pill received positive reviews. Rolling Stone gave the album four stars and said "it has the roiling honesty and brutal exuberance of their best records." Douglas Heselgrave, writing for Paste Magazine, said: "Psychedelic Pill may be the best album Neil Young has ever done with Crazy Horse. It'll take years to figure out." Dan Stubbs, giving the album 8 out of 10 stars for NME, writes: "two tracks here – 'Ramada Inn' and 'Walk like a Giant' – could sit among Young's best." Other reviewers were less generous, such as the Chicago Sun-Times, which stated that the album "boasts a few brilliant moments amid numerous typically thundering and meandering dull diversions." Robert Christgau suggested in 2018 that he appreciated the album and may have underrated it at the time of its release, writing it "showed up in my Neither file, which these days is kind of an honor, because I seldom add to it now that I don't feel obliged to nail down every possible Honorable Mention."

The album was listed at number 10 on Rolling Stones list of the top 50 albums of 2012, saying, "This is as inspiringly strange as anything he's done." They also named the song "Ramada Inn" the fifth best song of 2012.

Track listing 

Disc one

Disc two

Vinyl
 A1 – "Driftin' Back" (Part 1) – 18:14
 B1 – "Driftin' Back" (Part 2) – 9:56
 B2 – "Psychedelic Pill" (Alternate Mix) – 3:11
 C1 – "Psychedelic Pill" – 3:26 (mislabeled "alternate mix")
 C2 – "Ramada Inn" – 16:52
 D1 – "Born in Ontario" – 3:49
 D2 – "Twisted Road" – 3:28
 D3 – "She's Always Dancing" – 8:34
 D4 – "For the Love of Man" – 4:13
 E1 – "Walk like a Giant" – 16:31
 F  - etched art

Blu-ray
 "Driftin' Back" – 27:42
 "Psychedelic Pill" – 3:28
 "Ramada Inn" – 16:50
 "Born in Ontario" – 3:50
 "Twisted Road" – 3:28
 "She's Always Dancing" – 8:33
 "For the Love of Man" – 4:13
 "Walk like a Giant" – 16:28
 "Horse Back" – 37:05
 "Psychedelic Pill" (Alternate Mix 1) – 3:12
 "Psychedelic Pill" (Alternate Mix 2) – 3:11

Personnel
Neil Young – vocals, guitar, pump organ, stringman, whistlingCrazy Horse'''
Billy Talbot – bass, vocals
Ralph Molina – drums, vocals
Frank "Poncho" Sampedro – guitar, vocals

Audio production
Produced by Neil Young and John Hanlon with Mark Humphreys
Recorded by John Hanlon
Engineered by John Hanlon with John Hausmann and Jeff Pinn, Except "Driftin' Back" acoustic intro- Recorded by John Nowland, assisted by Charles Brotman
Recorded at Audio Casa Blanca, Broken Arrow Ranch, Redwood City, CA, Except "Driftin' Back" acoustic intro-Recorded at Lava Tracks, Kamuela, HI
Mixed at Redwood Digital's Analog Mixing Room by John Hanlon and Neil Young
Digital Mastering to 24-bit/192 kHz by Tim Mulligan at Redwood Digital
Analog to digital transfers by John Nowland at His Master’s Wheels

Blu-ray production
Director: Bernard Shakey
Producer: Will Mitchell
Executive producer: Elliot Rabinowitz
Post production at Shakey Pictures and Upstream Multimedia
Art direction: Toshi Onuki
Editors: Mark Faulkner, Benjamin Johnson, Will Mitchell
Motion graphics: Kris Kunz
Film research: Cameron Kunz, Mark Faulkner, Will Mitchell, Sarah Yee
Licensing and clearances: Marcy Gensic
Blu-ray authoring, programming at MX San Francisco, CA

Charts

References

Neil Young albums
Crazy Horse (band) albums
2012 albums
Reprise Records albums
Albums produced by John Hanlon
Psychedelic rock albums by American artists
Psychedelic rock albums by Canadian artists